By the end of the 20th century, the theological importance of the Holy Spirit in Johannine literature had been accepted by New Testament scholars, overshadowing the early 20th-century views that minimized its role in the writings of John.

The terms
Three separate terms, namely Holy Spirit, Spirit of Truth, and Paraclete, are used in Johannine literature. The "Spirit of Truth" is used in John 14:17, 15:26 and 16:13. The First Epistle of John then contrasts this with the "spirit of error" in 1 John 4:6.  provides the separation between spirits "that confesseth that Jesus Christ is come in the flesh is of God" and those who in error refuse it—an indication of their being evil spirits.

In John 14:26 Jesus states: "But the Comforter, [even] the Holy Spirit, whom the Father will send in my name, he shall teach you all things". The identity of the "Comforter" has been the subject of debate among theologians, who have proposed multiple theories on the matter.

The concept of "truth" in Johannine writings is then intertwined with 's statement of how the Spirit of Truth acts as guide that leads believers to truth, building on the assurance given in John 14:26 that the Paraclete facilitates and confirms the memory of "all that Jesus had taught his disciples" and John 15:26's statement that "Spirit of truth, which proceedeth from the Father, he shall bear witness of me".

References

Bibliography

Bellinzoni, Arthur J. (25 February 2000). The Early Christian Community: From Diversity to Unity to Orthodoxy. Lecture delivered to the Wells College Faculty Club.

Holy Spirit
Johannine literature